A list of animated feature films first released in 1994.

Highest-grossing animated films of the year

See also
 List of animated television series of 1994

References

 Feature films
1994
1994-related lists